Wolfoo is a Vietnamese YouTube preschool animated web series by SCONNECT and WOA Entertainment.

Synopsis
The show follows Wolfoo, an anthropomorphic male wolf living on a hill in a small American village with his parents and sisters, Lucy and Jenny. Pando and Kat are Wolfoo's best friends. SCONNECT has been sued for copyright infringement by the creators of Peppa Pig.

Broadcast
The first official episode of Wolfoo first came out in 2018 on YouTube. There are currently many channels under the Wolfoo brand. Among these are "Wolfoo America", "Wolfoo's Stories", "Wolfoo Shows", and "Wolfoo - Sing Along Songs". This is similar to a method used by other content farms, like TheSoul Publishing’s 5-Minute Crafts.

A feature-length animation, Wolfoo the Adventurer, has also been released.

Wolfoo is also dubbed in several languages such as Spanish, Indonesian, Tagalog, Russian, Vietnamese and much more. The voice cast list of the series has never been publicly released. A spin-off, Bearee, began on 16 April 2022.

But also has gross-out humor throughout its run, constantly featuring cartoonish depictions of defecation and or urination by several characters, pregnancy and anthropomorphic organs. It has been accused of copyright infringement by the creators of Peppa Pig,  and the show's distributor, Entertainment One,  has sued SCONNECT for Wolfoo's visual and aesthetic similarity to the show. Entertainment One have successfully requested YouTube to take down the infringing episodes, and over 2,000 videos have been taken down. SCONNECT would also be blocked from uploading new videos due to their infringing activity, which involves both audio and visual copyright infringement. The UK Court confirmed it is a suitable jurisdiction for the dispute and dismissed Sconnect's complaints. The judge at the preliminary hearing noted that the imagery between Wolfoo and Peppa Pig is "remarkably similar". Sconnect were ordered by the UK Court to pay over £200,000 in legal costs to Entertainment One as a result of the ongoing dispute.

On 15 December 2022, the trademark office of Russia (RUSPTO) refused to register the Wolfoo trademark in Russia, citing the reason that it was confusingly similar to the Peppa Pig trademarks already registered in Russia, and would therefore cause confusion amongst consumers as to the origin of the trademark.

Characters 

 Wolfoo, the show's titular character - a 5-year-old anthropomorphic wolf, he likes to play with his friends and his sister is Lucy.
 Lucy, a 3-year-old anthropomorphic wolf, who is Wolfoo's sister, and Mr. and Mrs. Wolf's daughter.
 Grandma Wolf, an adult anthropomorphic elderly wolf who is Wolfoo, Lucy, and Jenny's grandmother.
 Grandpa Wolf, an adult anthropomorphic elderly wolf who is Wolfoo, Lucy, and Jenny's grandfather.
 Jenny, a 1-year-old anthropomorphic wolf who is Wolfoo and Lucy's cousin and Mr. and Mrs. Wolf's daughter.
 Mrs. Wolf, an adult anthropomorphic wolf who is Wolfoo, Lucy, and Jenny's mother.
 Mr. Wolf, an adult anthropomorphic wolf who is Wolfoo, Lucy, and Jenny's father.
 Pando, a 5-year-old anthropomorphic panda who likes eating apples, and his best friend is Wolfoo.
 Bearee, a 5-year-old anthropomorphic bear who is one of Wolfoo's friends. He has his own spin-off show.
 Nancy, a 3-year-old anthropomorphic pig who is Piggy's sister and Mr. and Mrs. Pig's daughter.
 Kat, a 5-year-old anthropomorphic cat who likes study, and her best friend is Wolfoo.
 Moly, a 5-year-old anthropomorphic mole who likes to dig up holes.
 Piggy, a 5-year-old anthropomorphic pig, his best friend is Bufo.
 Mrs. Pig, an adult anthropomorphic pig who is Mr. Pig's wife and her children.
 Mr. Pig, an adult anthropomorphix pig who is Mrs. Pig's husband and his children.
 Bufo, a 5-year-old anthropomorphic bison, his best friend is Piggy.
 Teacher, an anthropomorphic bison who is the teacher of Bufo.
 Police, an adult anthropomorphic bison who is Bufo's father.
 Karoo, a 5-year-old anthropomorphic kangaroo who likes doing sports.
 Doly, a 5-year-old anthropomorphic sheep who is very girly and pretty.
 Pandollar, a 1-year-old anthropomorphic panda who is Pando's cousin and Mr. and Mrs. Non Stick Pan's daughter.
 Mrs. Pan, an adult anthropomorphic panda who is both Pando and Pandollar's mother.
 Mr. Pan, an adult anthropomorphic panda who is both Pando and Pandollar's father.
 Madame Kat, an adult anthropomorphic cat who is a teacher and Kat's mother.
 Dr. Kat, an adult anthropomorphic cat who is Kat's father.
 Narrator, a human who is a narrator that appears on title card in the series.
 Croco, a 5-year-old anthropomorphic crocodile who is clumsy.
 Doctor, an adult anthropomorphic giraffe who is a doctor of Wolfoo.
 Mr. Zebra, an anthropomorphic zebra who likes building.
 Alien, a 5-year-old anthropomorphic alien who lives in space and is one of Wolfoo's friends.
 Mr. Croco, an adult anthropomorphic crocodile who is Croco's father.
 Nurse, an adult anthropomorphic deer who is a nurse.
 Scout, an adult anthropomorphic skunk who is a badger.
 Thief, an anthropomorphic Rhinoceros who is a thief.
 Mr. Leopard, an anthropomorphic jaguar who is a second co-thief.

Episodes

References

2018 Vietnamese television series debuts
Vietnamese animated television series
Television shows involved in plagiarism controversies
Vietnamese television series